Chamakura Malla Reddy is an Indian politician serving as the Minister of Labour and Employment in Telangana, having assumed that office in 2019. He is the Member of Legislative Assembly (MLA) from Medchal assembly constituency. His children are Mamatha Reddy, Mahender Reddy, and Dr. Bhadra Reddy. He was the Member of Parliament in the Lok Sabha from Malkajgiri. He is a member of the Telangana Rashtra Samithi. He is an educationist and a businessman in Telangana state. He is the founder chairman of Malla Reddy Narayana Multispeciality Hospital.

Early life
Malla Reddy was born on 9 September 1953. He was born and brought up in Bowenpally. He studied in Wesley Co-education High School and intermediate in Mahabubia Junior College.

Political career

On 19 March 2014, he joined the Telugu Desam Party. He was selected by the party to contest a seat on 9 April 2014 and on 16 May 2014 went on to be elected as member of parliament for Malkajgiri. He was the only Member of Parliament for the Telugu Desam Party to win a seat in Telangana. In June 2016, Malla Reddy switched parties to the Telangana Rashtra Samithi. He is the minister of Women and Child Welfare in Telangana State Government. He was formally inducted in the Cabinet on 19th of Feb 2019.

References

External links

Lok Sabha members from Telangana
India MPs 2014–2019
Living people
Telangana MLAs 2018–2023
1953 births
People from Ranga Reddy district